Selby High School is a co-educational secondary school in North Yorkshire, England. Its main catchment area is the town of Selby and villages from the Selby District, including Thorpe Willoughby, Hambleton, Monk Fryston, Cawood and Wistow.

History
Selby High School links back to Selby Grammar School, founded in 1908 as an all-girls school as Selby High School. In 1967 this changed to the Selby Grammar School grammar school and became coeducational, and in 1979, a mixed comprehensive school. The comprehensive was renamed Selby High School.

Buildings
In 2003 Selby High School began fundraising towards securing specialist school status – the school was awarded specialist status in Performing and Visual Arts in 2005. Following this the school built a dance studio, a 325-seat theatre stand and an all-weather pitch. In September 2010 the school was awarded specialist status in Science. The school maintains these specialisms in the present day. In January 2013 the school added an ICT suite with new computers. In 2017 it added the Eckersley Centre, A building named after the previous headmaster, Paul Eckersley.

House system
In 2005 the school introduced a new house system with pupils from all year groups equally distributed into forms. The houses are named after significant Yorkshire people: Lesley Garrett (Garrett); David Hockney (Hockney); James Mason (Mason); and Michael Palin (Palin). These houses have been in the school for a long time now, with 1 of each group in every year. In each year group there are 2 classes per house, so about 50–60 people per house. In total there is about 250 students a house. There are around 1400 students in Selby high school each school year.

Notable former pupils 

 Nigel Adams – MP for Selby and Ainsty (attended the school 1978–84)
 Gareth Ellis – rugby league England international who currently plays for Hull F.C.
 Gerard Jones – professional football coach and entrepreneur (attended the school 2000-05)
 Matthew Warchus – theatre and film director (attended the school 1978–84)

Selby Grammar School
 Dianne Bevan (nee Roe), Chief Operating Officer from 2007–12 of the National Assembly for Wales
 Sir John Arthur Townsley – Executive Principal, Gorse Academies Trust   (attended the school 1976–1982)
 Geoff Wilkinson, music producer of Us3

Selby Girls' High School
 Prof Judy Armitage FRS, Professor of Biochemistry since 1996 at the University of Oxford (Merton College)

Former teachers
 Mary Blake, Headmistress from 1975–83 of Manchester High School for Girls (head teacher of the girls' high school from 1960–68, and the grammar school from 1968–75) and the first President of the Secondary Heads Association in 1978
 Joan Firth CB, Chair of Bradford Health Authority from 1998–2000 (Head of Science from 1960–62 at the girls' high school)
 Brian Sherratt, Head of Religious Studies at the grammar school from 1967–70

References

External links 
 "Selby High School Specialist School for the Arts and Science", Ofsted reports 2001–13

Community schools in North Yorkshire
Educational institutions established in 1908
Secondary schools in North Yorkshire
Selby
1908 establishments in England
Specialist science colleges in England
Specialist arts colleges in England